Police Tero Football Club, formerly known as BEC-Tero Sasana Football Club, is a Thai professional football club based in Bangkok. The club finished runners-up in the inaugural AFC Champions League competition in 2003. BEC-Tero Sasana merged with Police United in the 2017 season and changed its official name to Police-Tero Football Club in the 2018 season.

History

Establishment of the club
The team was established in 1992. It was previously known as Sasana Witthaya School team and was founded by Worawi Makudi. The first football match the team entered was in Division 3 of the football royal cup in 1993. In 1994, the team played in Division 2 of the football royal cup. In 1995, the team played in Division 1 of the football royal cup and in 1996, the team entered the Thai League for the first time. It was during this year, that Mr. Worawi Makudi and Mr. Brian L. Marcar, managing director of BEC-TERO Entertainment Public Co. Ltd., joined hands and renamed the team as Tero Sasana Football Club. The team was placed in 12th position among 18 teams in the Thai League.

In 1997, Tero Sasana Football Club also played in the Thai League and this time was placed in fifth place. Later in 1998, BEC World Public Company Limited supported the Tero Sasana Football Club and changed the team's name to BEC Tero Sasana FC. The team won the third place when they played the Thai League. They were also one of the eight final teams to enter the final round of the Thai FA Cup.

In 1999, the team entered the Thai League and again won third place. In the same year, they were among the final teams in the Thai FA Cup.

The Thai giant and the final Asian Champions League
2000 was a very eventful year for BEC Tero Sasana FC. The team won its first championship award by winning the Thai League. It also received the championship award for the King's Cup.

In 2001, BEC Tero Sasana FC was able to keep its championship and won the Thai Premier League for the second consecutive year. This greatly increased the fan base. In that year, the club participated in POMIS Cup in Maldives.

The club's success continued for a few years and culminated with finishing runner-up in the 2002–03 AFC Champions League. The team were put alongside Asian heavyweights Kashima Antlers, Daejeon Citizen, and Shanghai Shenhua in Group A of the 2002–03 AFC Champions League; a group which they would top with 7 points. Bec Tero Sansana then faced Uzbekistan's Pakhtakor in the semi final and defeated them 3–2 on aggregate, before losing to Al Ain in the two-legged Final, 2–1.

Golden Generation

In 2012 the club appointed Robert Procureur, former general manager of Muangthong United, to be the new Director of Football and appointed Andrew Ord as the club manager. Them built up a great team by pushing up many young players such as Adisorn Promrak, Peerapat Notchaiya, Tanaboon Kesarat, Chanathip Songkrasin, Narubadin Weerawatnodom, Tristan Do, Chenrop Samphaodi, Jaturong Pimkoon and the fan called "Golden Generation" and the club signed former Japan national team player Daiki Iwamasa that was the important to help the team win the Thai League Cup Trophy in 2014 from Daiki Iwamasa and Georgie Welcome's goals, its first trophy in 12 years.

Decline and financial ruin
After the club was relegated in 2016 (Saraburi F.C. was out of the Thai league due to money problems so the club was placed in the place of Saraburi), club president Brian L. Marcar sold the team to Inspire Entertainment, the owner of Muangthong United. Robert Procureur quit and star players such as Peerapat Notchaiya, Tanaboon Kesarat, Chanathip Songkrasin and Tristan Do joined various clubs, such as Muangthong United.

Merging: BEC Tero Sasana and Police United
In 2017 the club were taken over by the Royal Thai Police, who merged them with their own club, Police United. The club name change was not recognized in 2017, so in 2018, the club changed their name to Police Tero Football Club.

Return to the Thai League 1
In October 2019, under head coach Rangsan Viwatchaichok, Police Tero were runners-up in the 2019 Thai League 2 and were promoted to the 2020 Thai League 1.

Stadium and locations

Season by season record

P = Played
W = Games won
D = Games drawn
L = Games lost
F = Goals for
A = Goals against
Pts = Points
Pos = Final position
N/A = No answer

TL = Thai League 1

QR1 = First Qualifying Round
QR2 = Second Qualifying Round
QR3 = Third Qualifying Round
QR4 = Fourth Qualifying Round
RInt = Intermediate Round
R1 = Round 1
R2 = Round 2
R3 = Round 3

R4 = Round 4
R5 = Round 5
R6 = Round 6
GS = Group stage
QF = Quarter-finals
SF = Semi-finals
RU = Runners-up
S = Shared
W = Winners

Continental record

Players

First team squad

 

 (Captain)

Out on loan

Former players
For details on former players, see :Category:BEC Tero Sasana F.C. players.

Managerial history

Head coaches by years (1996/97-present)

Honours

Domestic competitions

League
 Thai League 1
Winners: 2000, 2001–02
Runners-up: 2002–03, 2003–04

Cups
 FA Cup
Runners-up: 2009
 League Cup
Winners: 2014
 Kor Royal Cup
Winners: 2000
Runners-up: 2002, 2004
 Queen's Cup
Runners-up: 2009

International competitions

Asian
 AFC Champions League
Runners-up: 2002–03

Asean
ASEAN Club Championship
Runners-up: 2003

Friendly
 Bhutan King's Cup
Winners: 2004

References

External links
 Official fanpage on Facebook

 
Football clubs in Thailand
Association football clubs established in 1992
Thai League 1 clubs
Sport in Bangkok
1992 establishments in Thailand
Police association football clubs in Thailand